The Carpenter, Lakeside, and Springvale Cemeteries are historic cemeteries located on Newman and Pawtucket Avenues in East Providence, Rhode Island, United States. The three cemeteries occupy a triangular area bounded by Newman and Pawtucket Avenues to the east and south, and railroad tracks to the west.  Carpenter Cemetery, the oldest, was established in 1844.  Springvale was established in 1888 and Lakeside in 1895.  The area is one of the few remaining undeveloped areas of what was once a "ring of green" around the historic center of Rehoboth, which was near this area.

The cemeteries were listed on the National Register of Historic Places in 1980.

See also
 National Register of Historic Places listings in Providence County, Rhode Island
 George N. Bliss – Civil War Medal of Honor recipient who is buried at Lakeside–Carpenter

References

External links
 
 

Cemeteries on the National Register of Historic Places in Rhode Island
Buildings and structures in East Providence, Rhode Island
National Register of Historic Places in Providence County, Rhode Island
1844 establishments in Rhode Island